Pasiphila urticae is a moth in the family Geometridae. It is found in New Zealand.

The larvae feed on Urtica ferox.

References

Moths described in 1939
urticae
Moths of New Zealand
Endemic fauna of New Zealand
Taxa named by George Hudson
Endemic moths of New Zealand